The 2020 Castrol Toyota Racing Series was the sixteenth running of the Toyota Racing Series, the premier open-wheel motorsport category held in New Zealand. The series consisted of fifteen races at five meetings. It began on 17 January at Highlands Motorsport Park, in Cromwell, and concluded on 16 February with the 65th running of the New Zealand Grand Prix, at Circuit Chris Amon in Feilding.

Changes

Technical 
In May 2019, the new Tatuus F.3 T-318, nicknamed "FT-60", chassis was revealed to be the chassis used from the 2020 season onwards. The change in chassis will also be accompanied by a new engine. The modified 1.8L Toyota four cylinder 2ZZ-GE production engines that were used since the series' inception will be replaced with a 2.0L turbocharged unit, increasing power output from 200bhp (150kW) to 270bhp (200kW). The top speed of the cars has increased to 250 km/h. The improved aerodynamics mean that the FT-60 is expected to generate around 25% more downforce that its predecessor. The six-speed Sadev paddle-shift sequential will remain.

Tyres 
In July 2019, it was announced that Hankook Tire would become the series' tyre supplier starting from the 2020 season. The new contract stipulates that 1,600 tyres will be brought in for each season, with each driver receiving 17 sets of tyres, with the ability to add a further two sets of wet weather tyres if required. The tyre is of the same specification used in Formula Renault Eurocup and the W Series. Tyre dimensions will also be changed in conjunction with the changing of supplier; 230/560 for the fronts and 280/580 for the rear.

Teams and drivers 
All teams are based and registered in New Zealand.

Team changes
A joint three-year effort between MTEC Motorsport and France-based R-ace GP will see the latter organization take charge of the race engineering side of the operation starting from the 2020 season.

MP Motorsport and Kiwi Motorsport announced they would be joining forces by supplying engineers and mechanics.

Race calendar
The 2020 calendar was announced on 30 April 2019. Each round will have three races each, with qualifying taking place for both races one and three.

Championship standings

The series had introduced a new drivers' championship points system for the season.  Drivers were awarded the same number of points for Races 1 & 3.  Race 2 featured a reversed grid of the top 6 to 8 finishers from Race 1, and awarded reduced points to the top 15 finishers. Drivers must have completed 75% of the race distance and be running at the finish to score points.

Scoring system
Race (starting grid from qualifying)

Reversed grid Race

Drivers' championship

Footnotes

References

External links
 

Toyota Racing Series
Toyota Racing Series
Toyota Racing Series
Toy
Toy
Toyota Racing Series